Sredny Vasyugan is a rural locality (a selo) in Kargasoksky District of Tomsk Oblast, Russia, located on the left bank of the Vasyugan River near its confluence with the Varinegan, and  from Kargasok, the administrative center of the district. Population: 1,622 (2012 est.). Postal code: 636733.

History
It was first mentioned around 1700. On Semyon Remezov's  map of Siberia (1696-1698) it is designated as Vasyugan Yurts. It was later known as Vasyugan Yurt, Yurt Church, Vasyugan, and finally Sredny Vasyugan.

Infrastructure
There is a wharf and an airport in Sredny Vasyugan. Kargasok–Katylga winter road passes through it.

Facilities include a school, a kindergarten, a cultural center, and a library.

Climate

References

Rural localities in Tomsk Oblast